Prahran Assumption Football Club, nicknamed The Two Blues, is an Australian rules football club based at Toorak Park in Orrong Road between High Street and Malvern Road, Armadale, in Melbourne, Victoria, Australia. The club is currently in Division 1 of the Victorian Amateur Football Association (VAFA). The nickname Two Blues comes from the club uniform which has been royal blue and sky blue since the club formed in 1886.

Teams 
Prahran fields Senior, Reserves, Club XVIII and junior teams. The senior team was coached in 2006 by Leigh Stafford, who resigned from the coaching role at the end of the season.
In 2007 the new coach is Paul Greenham, who has played for Richmond, Port Melbourne & St Kevins.

Its sister team is the Deakin Devils – a Division 1 Victorian Women's Football League (VWFL) team.

History 

A club from Prahran first played as a senior club in the Victorian Football Association in 1886 and 1887, playing its games first at the Warehouseman's Cricket Ground, then at the Wesley College Ground. After 1887, it amalgamated with the neighbouring St Kilda Football Club, which was based less than a mile away.

A new senior Prahran Football Club was established in March 1899, and joined the VFA that season, this time playing at Toorak Park, approximately two miles from St Kilda. It played in the VFA between 1899 and 1994, with the exception of 1959, when it competed in the Metropolitan League; this was because the Prahran Council would not lease Toorak Park to Prahran's Seconds team, leaving the club expelled from the Association's requirements for failing to meet its minimum home ground requirements. At the end of 1994, when administration of the VFA was turned over to the Victorian State Football League, Prahran left the Association as part of the VSFL's efforts to reduce the size of the VFA and align it with the TAC Cup; Prahran's identity was carried on within the TAC Cup from 1995, when the Central Dragons club moved to Toorak Park and was renamed the Prahran Dragons, a name it carried until the end of 1999.

The club continued to exist in an administrative capacity after its departure from the VFA, and continued to operate the Prahran Tabaret – a gambling bar it owns and operates in Chapel Street, Prahran – despite having no on-field presence. In 1999, the club merged with Southbank Amateur Football Club in 1999 and joined the Victorian Amateur Football Association under the stewardship of Herald Sun racing writer Tim Habel. It also re-established its junior arm; and, after commencing with just two junior teams, the club now has eight junior teams and has formed a joint Under 19 team with Caulfield Football Club. In 2010, a joint venture with Assumption College was approved and in 2011 the club changed its name to Prahran/Assumption Football Club.

Andre Pitts played his 350th game for the club in 2007

Premierships

VAFA Division 2: 
2017
VAFA Division 3: 
2011
VFA Division 1: 
1937 - Prahran: 12.13 - 85 defeated Brunswick: 11.17 - 83  At Toorak Park.
1951 - Prahran: 11.13 - 79 defeated Port Melbourne: 10.10 - 70  At the Junction Oval, St. Kilda.
1970 - Prahran 17.18 - 120 defeated Williamstown: 10.10 -70  At St Kilda Cricket Ground
1973 
1978
VFA Division 2: 
1966, 
1987
Metropolitan League: 
1959

League Best & Fairest Awards
VFA - Recorder Cup
1928 - Frank Smith
1931 - Bill Koop
1935 - Les White
VFA - J J Liston Trophy
1993 - Michael Sinni

Club champions / best and fairest
 1904 – George Brown (best all-round)
 1940 – Bill Faul
 1945 – A Gardiner
 1952 – Ian Armstrong

Prahran FC - Team of the Century

Back:      Vin Crowe,      Kerry Foley,	Robert Anderson
Half Back:    Bill Faul,	    Dick Culpin,	Ian McGuiness
Centre:	Frank Smith,	Pat Walsh (c),	Ken Emselle
Half Forward: Wayne Johnston,	Bill Morrow,	Glenn Dickson
Forward:   Barry Pearson,	George Hawkins,	Les White
Follower:  Rod Payne,	    Kevin Rose,	    Ray Harvey (vc)
Interchange: Kim Smith, Bill Koop,	Graeme McMahon, John Townsend, Ross Thornton, Michael Sinni.
Coach: Kevin Rose

Selected in 2003 by - Jack Morgans, Ray Harvey, Charlie Roach and Ray Ryan.

VFL / AFL players 
The following well known footballers played with Prahran FC prior to making their senior VFL / AFL debut. View the complete list at the bottom of this page under "Prahran Football Club Players".

1941 - Harold Bray – finished in the top three in the Brownlow Medal three times 
1967 - Kevin Sheedy – former coach of Essendon Football Club and former Richmond player, began his football career with Prahran.
1979 - Wayne Johnston – went on to play in four Premierships for Carlton Football Club
1980 - Ross Thornton –  went onto to play for Fitzroy Football Club
1984 - Graeme Yeats – went on to play 182 games for Melbourne Football Club
1987 - Jim Stynes – won a Brownlow Medal and went on to set an Australian Football League record for most consecutive games (244) for Melbourne Football Club

The following footballers played with Prahran FC after playing senior VFL / AFL football, with the year indicating their first season with Prahran.
1951 - Don Chipp – Australian Federal politician. A former Liberal Minister in the Australian government and inaugural leader of the Australian Democrats political party. Played in the club's 1951 VFA Premiership team.
1978 - Sam Kekovich – North Melbourne Premiership player and well known football identity.
1991 - Brian Taylor
2001 - Tony Free – player-coach in 2001 and 2002 after retiring from an illustrious career with the Richmond Football Club including being Captain of the Tigers.

Thomas Anthony McLaughlin. Born Belfast, travelled to Australia to complete his professional Football career playing for Prahran 1963-1965

Further reading
Fiddian, Marc The Blue Boys: a History of the Prahran Football Club, Prahran Football Club, Melbourne 1986

References

External links

Official website

Former Victorian Football League clubs
Australian rules football clubs in Melbourne